Jhal Magsi District is a district in central Balochistan in Pakistan. Previously part of Kachhi District, it was established as a district of its own in December 1991 and after a brief period in which it was known as Kachhi (the remainder of the old Kachhi district being renamed to Bolan), its name was changed to Jhal Magsi in May 1992. The district is named after the town of Jhal, seat of the Magsi tribe, the major Baloch tribe within the district Is Magsi Lashari. Historically, the Magsi tribe branched off from the earlier Lashari tribe.

The district has two main towns, Gandawah, the administrative centre and Jhal Magsi; and is divided into two subdivisions: Gandawah and Jhal Magsi. The City is also known for ancient places and tourist attractions like Peer Chattal Shah Noorani, Taj Mahal of Balochistan (Moti Gohram Tomb), Moola River, Peer Lakha and more.

Demographics

At the time of the 2017 census the district had a population of 148,900, of which 7,815 (5.25%) lived in urban areas. Jhal Magsi had a sex ratio of 941 females per 1000 males and a literacy rate of 23.46% - 31.87% for males and 14.60% for females. 57,446 (38.58%) were under 10 years of age.

At the time of the 2017 census, 76.32% of the population spoke Balochi, 14.33% Sindhi, 5.67% Saraiki and 3.29% Brahui as their first language.

Administrative divisions
Jhal Magsi District is administratively divided into two tehsils, Jhal Magsi and Gandawah; with one sub tehsil (Mirpur). Both subdivisions have a different administrative history.

It had nine Union Council in 2012, but last year four Union Council were added by the Local Government Department at recommendation of Deputy Commissioner/Delimitation Officer. Namely, the union councils of Jhal Magsi District are as under:
 Gandawah Tehsil
 Union Council Gandawah
 Union Council Khari
 Union Council Patri
 Mirpur Sub Tehsil
 Union Council Mirpur
 Jhal Magsi Tehsil
 Union Council Jhal Magsi
 Union Council Hathiari
 Union Council Panjuk
 Union Council Kot Magsi
 Union Council Barija
 Union Council Mat Sindhur
 Union Council Safrani
 Union Council Saifabad
 Union Council Akbarabad

Education 
According to the Pakistan District Education Rankings 2017, district Jhal Magsi is ranked at number 108 out of the 141 ranked districts in Pakistan on the education score index. This index considers learning, gender parity and retention in the district.

Literacy rate in 2014–15 of population 10 years and older in the district stood at 25% whereas for females it was only 11%.

Post primary access is a major issue in the district with 84% schools being at primary level. Compare this with high schools which constitute only 5% of government schools in the district. This is also reflected in the enrolment figures with 7,553 students enrolled in class 1 to 5 and only 118 students enrolled in class 9 and 10.

Gender disparity is another issue in the district. Only 33% schools in the district are girls’ schools. Access to education for girls is a major issue in the district and is also reflected in the low literacy rates for females.

Moreover, the schools in the district lack basic facilities. According to Alif Ailaan Pakistan District Education Rankings 2017, the district is ranked at number 142 out of the 155 districts of Pakistan for primary school infrastructure. At the middle school level, it is ranked at number 141 out of the 155 districts. These rankings take into account the basic facilities available in schools including drinking water, working toilet, availability of electricity, existence of a boundary wall and general building condition. More than 200 out of the 301 government schools in the district do not have electricity, toilet and a boundary wall. 139 schools do not have clean drinking water.

The main issues reported in Taleem Do! App for the district is the unavailability of teachers in schools.

References

Bibliography

External links

 Jhall Magsi District at www.balochistan.gov.pk
 Jhal Magsi Gwadar  at www.balochistanpolice.gov.pk
 Jhal Magsi District Development Profile 2011

 
Districts of Balochistan, Pakistan